The National Domestic Extremism Team was a police unit set up in 2005 within the association of chief police officers (England and Wales) to provide a dedicated response to tackling extremism. This team co-ordinates operations and investigations nationally, working closely in England and Wales with the Crown Prosecution Service which has set up a complementary network of prosecutors with specialist expertise in domestic extremism.

The unit was led by an officer of the rank of detective chief inspector. From 2009 to 2013 this was Andy Robbins. on secondment from Kent Police.

Definition of domestic extremism

The Guardian reported in 2009 that there was no official or legal definition of domestic extremism. However, they say that a "vague stab" at a working definition by senior officers is that domestic extremists are individuals or groups "that carry out criminal acts of direct action in furtherance of a campaign. These people and activities usually seek to prevent something from happening or to change legislation or domestic policy, but attempt to do so outside of the normal democratic process." The same article quotes activists criticising this definition as too loose, worded to give "police the licence to carry out widespread surveillance of whole organisations that are a legitimate part of the democratic process."

The Independent described the definition as "a label for radical environmental activism – a sort of terrorism-lite." It quoted David Howarth, a former Liberal Democrats MP and law professor, who opposed what he saw as "an astonishing conflation of legitimate protest with terrorism".

Takeover by the Metropolitan Police
In November 2010 it was announced that the three ACPO units commanded by the National Coordinator for Domestic Extremism would be rebranded as the National Domestic Extremism Unit and brought under the control of the Metropolitan Police by the summer of 2011.

See also
National Coordinator for Domestic Extremism
National Domestic Extremism Unit
National Extremism Tactical Co-ordination Unit
National Public Order Intelligence Unit
Special Demonstration Squad

References

Association of Chief Police Officers
National law enforcement agencies of the United Kingdom